Windham Carmichael-Anstruther may refer to:

Sir Windham Carmichael-Anstruther, 8th Baronet
Sir Windham Carmichael-Anstruther, 9th Baronet of the Anstruther baronets
Sir Windham Carmichael-Anstruther, 10th Baronet of the Anstruther baronets
Sir Windham Carmichael-Anstruther, 11th Baronet of the Anstruther baronets